Oakland Park was a ballpark in Jersey City, New Jersey. It was used by the New York Giants for their first two home games in 1889. The park was opened in the spring of 1888, as the new home of the Jersey City minor league club Jersey City Skeeters. The Jersey City club disbanded in July 1890, but the park continued to be used by other local teams for several years.

It was located on a block bounded by Oakland Avenue (northwest); Hoboken Avenue (southwest); Bonner (now Baldwin) Avenue (southeast); and Fleet Street (northeast). Newspaper accounts in 1888 reported that the grandstand was to be built along Hoboken to shade the fans from the sun. Given the orientation of the block, that suggests home plate to center field pointing roughly northeast. The papers also reported that the old stands from the unused west half of the first Polo Grounds were to be ferried across the river and reassembled at the new Oakland Park.

After the city had evicted the Giants from the original Polo Grounds at 110th Street and 5th Avenue in Manhattan, the Giants were compelled to find temporary home fields until they could secure a more permanent location. They played their first two games on April 24 and April 25 against Boston, each team winning one at Oakland Park.

Their next home game came on April 29, at the St. George Cricket Grounds in Staten Island. Their last game at St. George was on June 14. Their record at St. George was 17-6. After a lengthy road trip, on July 8 they finally debuted their new home field at 8th Avenue and 155th Street in Manhattan. They dubbed this field the new Polo Grounds. That general vicinity would be the Giants' home through the 1957 season.

Despite the nomadic nature of their 1889 season, the Giants would win the National League championship, edging out Boston by one game, and then go on to defeat Brooklyn in the NL-AA World Series.

Site Today

The ball park has since disappeared and the area is now residential area and home to General Pencil Company.

References

External links 
Retrosheet 1889 game log for the Giants

Defunct baseball venues in the United States
Defunct Major League Baseball venues
Defunct sports venues in New Jersey
Baseball venues in New Jersey